The following highways are numbered 555:

Canada
 Alberta Highway 555
 New Brunswick Route 555
 Ontario Highway 555 (former)

United States